Meikleour Arms (also known as the Meikleour Arms Hotel) is a Category B listed building in Meikleour, Perth and Kinross, Scotland. It dates to 1820, and is a single-storey building, built mostly of ashlar stone.

See also
List of listed buildings in Perth and Kinross

References

External links
 Meikleour Arms official website
 MEIKLEOUR HOTEL (MEIKLEOUR DISCRETIONARY TRUST, ELIZABETH FORSYTH TENANT) - Historic Environment Scotland

Category B listed buildings in Perth and Kinross
Buildings and structures in Perth and Kinross
1820 establishments in Scotland